The brown fur seal (Arctocephalus pusillus), also known as the Cape fur seal, South African fur seal and Australian fur seal, is a species of fur seal.

Description

The brown fur seal is the largest and most robust member of the fur seals. It has a large and broad head with a pointed snout that may be flat or turned up slightly. They have external ear flaps (pinnae) and their whiskers (vibrissae) are long, and may extend backward past the pinnae, especially in adult males. The fore flippers are covered with sparse hair over about three-quarters of their length. The hind flippers are short relative to the large body, with short, fleshy tips on the digits. The size and weight of the brown fur seal depends on the subspecies. The Southern African subspecies is on average slightly larger than the Australian subspecies. Females are smaller, averaging  in length and typically weighing  . Females are  length and weigh .

Adult male brown fur seals are dark gray to brown, with a darker mane of short, coarse hairs and a light belly, while adult females are light brown to gray, with a light throat and darker back and belly. The fore flippers of the fur seal are dark brown to black. Pups are born black and molt to gray with a pale throat within 3-5 months. The skull of the African subspecies has a larger crest between the mastoid process and the jugular process of the exoccipital.

Ecology

The African fur seal lives around the southern and southwestern coast of Africa from Cape Cross in Namibia and around the Cape of Good Hope to Black Rocks near Port Elizabeth in the Eastern Cape province. The Australian fur seal lives in Bass Strait, at four islands off Victoria in southeastern Australia, and five islands off Tasmania. Brown fur seals prefer to haul out and breed on rocky islands, rock ledges and reefs, and pebble and boulder beaches. However, some large colonies can be found on sandy beaches. Fur seals spend most of the year at sea, but are never too far from land. They have been recorded 160 km from land, but this is not common.

The African fur seal's diet is made of up to 70% fish, 20% squid, and 2% crab. Also eaten are other crustaceans, cephalopods and sometimes birds. In rare instances, they have even been documented attacking and eating sharks. A recent incident occurred off Cape Point, South Africa, where a large male was observed attacking and killing five blue sharks between 1.0 and 1.4 m long. Observers concluded that the seal likely killed the sharks to eat the fish-rich contents of their stomachs, as well as their livers as a source of energy. The Australian fur seal mostly eats squid, octopus, fish, and lobsters. The brown fur seal dives for its food. The African subspecies can dive as deep as 204 m and for as long as 7.5 minutes. The Australian subspecies generally feeds at lower depths, diving on average 120 m and can reach as deep as 200 m.

The brown fur seal's main predator is the great white shark, although they are also preyed upon by various other animals, such as killer whales and vagrant southern elephant seals. Land-based predators include black-backed jackals, brown hyenas and occasionally lions on the Skeleton Coast in Namibia.  In addition, seagulls are thought to peck the eyes out of baby seals to render them helpless and disabled, as they begin to feast on their flesh.

In False Bay, the seals employ a number of antipredatory strategies while in shark-infested waters, such as:
Swimming in large groups and harassing sharks in the vicinity
Low porpoising to increase subsurface vigilance
Darting in different directions to cause confusion when attacked
Using their greater agility to stay out of reach
Riding near the dorsal fin to keep out of reach of the shark's jaws when attacked

Behaviour

Acoustic behavior
Australian fur seals are social animals that use vocalizations in a broad range of contexts. These vocalizations have been shown to contain individually unique properties important for enabling individual recognition.
This is particularly important for the reunion of mothers and pups that experience repeated separations whilst mothers are out at sea foraging, sometimes for days at a time. 
Upon their return, mothers need to locate their pups. This reunion process may also be facilitated through a combination of smell and spatial cues.   
 
In males, increases in testosterone and calling rates are seen in conjunction with the onset of the breeding season. Males can also differentiate neighboring males from stranger males, responding more aggressively to the vocalizations of strangers. This difference in response is suspected because the threat posed by a stranger is unknown and potentially greater than their neighbor, which they would have previously encountered while establishing their territories.

Breeding behaviour
Brown fur seals often gather into colonies on rookeries in numbers ranging from 500 to 1500, at least for the Australian subspecies. While fur seals spend most of the year at sea, they never fully evacuate the rookeries, as mothers and pups return to them throughout the year. No dispersal from a colony is established, although some fur seals from one colony have been found at another. True boundaries do not exist between the colonies. When at sea, they travel in small feeding groups. Brown fur seals begin to breed in the middle of October, when males haul out on shore to establish territories though display, vocalisations, sparring, and sometimes actual combat . They fast at this time and do not eat until after mating in November or December. When the females arrive, they fight among themselves for territories in which to give birth. Female territories are smaller than those of males and are always located within them. Females within a male's territory can be considered part of his harem. However, males do not herd the females, which are free to choose their mates and judge them based on the value of their territories. For the Australian fur seals, 82% of copulations are performed by males whose territories are located directly at the water's edge. Copulation between the male and his females begins 6 days after they give birth to their pups conceived from the previous year. However, a delay occurs in the implantation of the blastocyst, which lasts 4 months in the African subspecies and 3 months in the Australian subspecies. Gestation for the brown fur seal typically lasts a year less a few days.

After mating, females begin alternating brief periods of foraging at sea with several days ashore nursing their pups. Foraging trips last about 7 days in winter and about 4 days in summer and autumn. When a mother returns from sea to feed her pup, she emits a loud call which attracts all the nearby pups, but she only responds to her pup. She possibly can recognize her pup by smell. When left alone, pups gather in groups and play during the evening. Pups are usually weaned at 4–6 months old.

Human interactions

This species is an inquisitive and friendly animal when in the water, and often accompanies scuba divers. They swim around divers for periods of several minutes at a time, even at a depth of 60 m. On land, they are far less relaxed and tend to panic when humans come near them.

Australian fur seals were hunted intensively between 1798 and 1825 for commercial reasons. Seal hunting stopped in Australia in 1923, and their population is still recovering, causing increasing friction with South Australian fishermen as their range expands. Breeding and haul-out sites are protected by law. South African fur seals have a very robust and healthy population. Harvesting of seals was outlawed in South Africa in 1990.

Brown fur seals are still harvested in Namibia. Permits are issued for the killing of pups for their luxurious fur and adult males for their genitalia, which are considered an aphrodisiac in some countries. It is also considered necessary to limit seal numbers in Namibia because of the supposed effect seals have on the country's fish harvest. Research by environmental groups disputes this.

In January 2023, media reports indicated that seals have been attacking humans in South Africa, particularly in Cape Town area. Scientists believe it is due to the presence of a brain-altering poison in the fish they consume. The poison is affecting their behavior and making them more aggressive towards humans. Some attribute the aggressive behavior of the animals to the surge of toxic red tide algae, fueled by pollution and climate change. The incidents have increased in recent times, leading to concern and calls for further investigation.

See also
Skull of adult male

References

External links

 Photos of brown fur seals at Cape Cross, Namibia – photographs and information
 Pictures of fur seals at Geyser Rock, South Africa on jostimages.com
 Animal Diversity Web – Arctocephalus pusillus

brown fur seal
Pinnipeds of Africa
Mammals of Southern Africa
Mammals of Tasmania
Mammals of South Australia
Mammals of Victoria (Australia)
Pinnipeds of Australia
brown fur seal
Taxa named by Johann Christian Daniel von Schreber